Leandro Daniel Cabrera Sasía (born 17 June 1991) is a Uruguayan professional footballer who plays for and captains La Liga club RCD Espanyol. Mainly a central defender, he can also play as a left-back.

He spent the vast majority of his career in Spain, mostly in Segunda División. Other than in his own country, he also competed professionally in Italy.

Club career

Atlético Madrid
Born in Montevideo, Cabrera started his career with local Defensor Sporting, playing seven Primera División matches for the first team as they won the 2009 Clausura. In June 2009 he signed with La Liga club Atlético Madrid for €1.5 million, paid to former Uruguay international player Daniel Fonseca who owned his rights (and ceded 50% to Atlético).

In a strange first season, where he even failed to appear for the reserves, Cabrera's debut for the first team only took place on 2 May 2010, featuring as a left-back in a 3–1 away defeat against Sevilla FC. He was also booked in the game.

In the summer of 2010, Cabrera was loaned to Recreativo de Huelva for 2010–11, with the Andalusians in the Segunda División. He joined another second-tier side, CD Numancia, on loan for the next campaign. The following five years – the first two on loan – he continued competing at that level with Hércules CF, Real Madrid Castilla and Real Zaragoza.

Crotone
On 15 July 2017, free agent Cabrera joined F.C. Crotone on a three-year deal. His debut in the Serie A took place on 20 August, when he featured the full 90 minutes in the 3–0 home loss to A.C. Milan.

Getafe
Cabrera returned to the Spanish top flight on 15 January 2018, being loaned to Getafe CF. On 7 July the move was made permanent, and he rarely missed a match during his spell at the Coliseum Alfonso Pérez.

Espanyol
On 20 January 2020, Cabrera signed a four-and-a-half-year contract with RCD Espanyol after his €9 million release clause was paid. In March, he tested positive for COVID-19.

Following the departure of David López in the 2022 off-season, Cabrera was named captain while also agreeing to an extension until 2026. On 28 August, as his team had no more substitutions left (a reserve goalkeeper was on the bench, however), he played a couple of minutes in goal after Benjamin Lecomte was sent off already in injury time, conceding one goal from Karim Benzema in an eventual 3–1 home defeat to Real Madrid.

International career
Cabrera represented Uruguay in two editions of the FIFA U-20 World Cup, reaching the round of 16 in 2009. On 7 January 2022, aged already 30, he was called by the full side for the first time, for 2022 FIFA World Cup qualifiers against Paraguay and Venezuela. In October, he was named in a 55-man preliminary squad for the finals in Qatar.

Honours
Defensor
Uruguayan Primera División: Clausura 2009

Atlético Madrid
UEFA Europa League: 2009–10

Espanyol
Segunda División: 2020–21

References

External links

1991 births
Living people
Uruguayan footballers
Footballers from Montevideo
Association football defenders
Uruguayan Primera División players
Defensor Sporting players
La Liga players
Segunda División players
Atlético Madrid footballers
Recreativo de Huelva players
CD Numancia players
Hércules CF players
Real Madrid Castilla footballers
Real Zaragoza players
Getafe CF footballers
RCD Espanyol footballers
Serie A players
F.C. Crotone players
Uruguay under-20 international footballers
Uruguayan expatriate footballers
Expatriate footballers in Spain
Expatriate footballers in Italy
Uruguayan expatriate sportspeople in Spain
Uruguayan expatriate sportspeople in Italy
Outfield association footballers who played in goal